Joaquín Arzura (born 18 May 1993) is an Argentine professional footballer who plays as a defensive midfielder for Instituto de Córdoba.

Club career
Arzura was a part of Tigre's youth academy until 2013, but made his senior debut in Copa Argentina on 29 November 2011. He came on as a substitute in the second half, and played a role when Tigre scored two late winning goals against Defensa y Justicia to make it 4–2.

His league debut came on 31 August 2013, in the 2013-14-season of Primera División, against Quilmes. He played in total 31 league games that season, making him an important player in Tigre's midfield.

On 4 January 2016, Arzura signed a 3.5 year long contract with current Copa Libertadores champions River Plate. On 28 July of the following year, after being sparingly used, he was loaned to Segunda División club CA Osasuna for one year.

On 16 July 2018, Arzura was loaned to UD Almería for one season. The following 23 January, his loan was cancelled and he moved to Nacional also in a temporary deal.

References

External links

1993 births
Living people
People from Campana, Buenos Aires
Argentine footballers
Argentine expatriate footballers
Association football midfielders
Footballers at the 2016 Summer Olympics
Olympic footballers of Argentina
Club Atlético Tigre footballers
Club Atlético River Plate footballers
CA Osasuna players
UD Almería players
Club Nacional de Football players
Club Atlético Huracán footballers
Panetolikos F.C. players
Instituto footballers
Argentine Primera División players
Segunda División players
Argentine expatriate sportspeople in Spain
Argentine expatriate sportspeople in Uruguay
Argentine expatriate sportspeople in Greece
Expatriate footballers in Spain
Expatriate footballers in Uruguay
Expatriate footballers in Greece
Sportspeople from Buenos Aires Province